A Minister of War is a defence minister.

Minister of War can also refer to:

Minister of War (Austria-Hungary)
Minister of War (Denmark)
Minister of War (France)
Minister of War of Hungary
Italian Minister of War
Minister of War (Netherlands)
Minister of War (Prussia)
Minister of War (Spain)

See also
Ministry of War (disambiguation)